This is a list of the mammal species recorded in Colombia. Of the mammals in Colombia, four are critically endangered, eight are endangered, twenty-seven are vulnerable, and six are near threatened. One of the species listed for Colombia is considered to be extinct.

The following tags are used to highlight each species' conservation status as assessed by the International Union for Conservation of Nature:

Some species were assessed using an earlier set of criteria. Species assessed using this system have the following instead of near threatened and least concern categories:

Subclass: Theria

Infraclass: Metatheria

Order: Didelphimorphia (common opossums)

Didelphimorphia is the order of common opossums of the Western Hemisphere. Opossums probably diverged from the basic South American marsupials in the late Cretaceous or early Paleocene. They are small to medium-sized marsupials, about the size of a large house cat, with a long snout and prehensile tail.

Family: Didelphidae (American opossums)
Subfamily: Caluromyinae
Genus: Caluromys
 Derby's woolly opossum, Caluromys derbianus VU
 Brown-eared woolly opossum, Caluromys lanatus LR/nt
Subfamily: Didelphinae
Genus: Chironectes
 Water opossum, Chironectes minimus LR/nt
Genus: Didelphis
 White-eared opossum, Didelphis albiventris LR/lc
 Common opossum, Didelphis marsupialis LR/lc
Genus: Gracilinanus
 Wood sprite gracile opossum, Gracilinanus dryas VU
 Long-tailed gracile mouse opossum, Gracilinanus longicaudus DD
 Northern gracile opossum, Gracilinanus marica LR/nt
 Columbian gracile mouse opossum, Gracilinanus perijae DD
Genus: Lutreolina
 Big lutrine opossum, Lutreolina crassicaudata LR/lc
Genus: Marmosa
 Alston's mouse opossum, Marmosa alstoni LR/nt
 White-bellied woolly mouse opossum, Marmosa constantiae LR/nt
 Woolly mouse opossum, Marmosa demerarae LR/lc
 Rufous mouse opossum, Marmosa lepida LR/nt
 Linnaeus's mouse opossum, Marmosa murina LR/lc
 Bare-tailed woolly mouse opossum, Marmosa regina LR/lc
 Robinson's mouse opossum, Marmosa robinsoni LR/lc
 Guajira mouse opossum, Marmosa xerophila EN
Genus: Marmosops
 Dusky slender opossum, Marmosops fuscatus LR/nt
 Handley's slender opossum, Marmosops handleyi CR
 Tschudi's slender opossum, Marmosops impavidus LR/nt
 Delicate slender opossum, Marmosops parvidens LR/nt
Genus: Metachirus
 Brown four-eyed opossum, Metachirus nudicaudatus LR/lc
Genus: Monodelphis
 Sepia short-tailed opossum, Monodelphis adusta LR/lc
Genus: Philander
 Anderson's four-eyed opossum, Philander andersoni LR/lc
 Gray four-eyed opossum, Philander opossum LR/lc

Order: Paucituberculata (shrew opossums)

There are six extant species of shrew opossum. They are small shrew-like marsupials confined to the Andes.

Family: Caenolestidae
Genus: Caenolestes
 Northern caenolestid, C. convelatus 
 Dusky caenolestid, C. fuliginosus

Infraclass: Eutheria

Order: Sirenia (manatees and dugongs)

Sirenia is an order of fully aquatic, herbivorous mammals that inhabit rivers, estuaries, coastal marine waters, swamps, and marine wetlands. All four species are endangered.

Family: Trichechidae
Genus: Trichechus
 Amazonian manatee, T. inunguis VU
 West Indian manatee, T. manatus VU

Order: Cingulata (armadillos)

The armadillos are small mammals with a bony armored shell. They are native to the Americas. There are around 20 extant species.

Family: Dasypodidae (armadillos)
Subfamily: Dasypodinae
Genus: Dasypus
 Greater long-nosed armadillo, Dasypus kappleri LC
 Nine-banded armadillo, Dasypus novemcinctus LC
 Llanos long-nosed armadillo, Dasypus sabanicola LC
Subfamily: Tolypeutinae
Genus: Cabassous
 Northern naked-tailed armadillo, Cabassous centralis DD
 Southern naked-tailed armadillo, Cabassous unicinctus LC
Genus: Priodontes
 Giant armadillo, Priodontes maximus VU

Order: Pilosa (anteaters, sloths and tamanduas)

The order Pilosa is extant only in the Americas and includes the anteaters, sloths, and tamanduas.

Suborder: Folivora
Family: Bradypodidae (three-toed sloths)
Genus: Bradypus
 Pale-throated three-toed sloth, Bradypus tridactylus LC
 Brown-throated three-toed sloth, Bradypus variegatus LC
Family: Choloepodidae (two-toed sloths)
Genus: Choloepus
 Linnaeus's two-toed sloth, Choloepus didactylus LC
 Hoffmann's two-toed sloth, Choloepus hoffmanni LC
Suborder: Vermilingua
Family: Cyclopedidae
Genus: Cyclopes
 Silky anteater, C. didactylus LC
Central American silky anteater, C. dorsalis 
Family: Myrmecophagidae (American anteaters)
Genus: Myrmecophaga
 Giant anteater, Myrmecophaga tridactyla NT
Genus: Tamandua
 Northern tamandua, Tamandua mexicana LC
 Southern tamandua, Tamandua tetradactyla LC

Order: Primates

The order Primates contains humans and their closest relatives: lemurs, lorisoids, monkeys, and apes.

Suborder: Haplorhini
Infraorder: Simiiformes
Parvorder: Platyrrhini (New World monkeys)
Family: Cebidae
Subfamily: Callitrichinae
Genus: Callithrix
 Pygmy marmoset, Cebuella pygmaea LC
Genus: Leontocebus
 Lesson's saddle-back tamarin, Leontocebus fuscus LC
 Black-mantled tamarin, Leontocebus nigricollis LC
Genus: Saguinus
 Geoffroy's tamarin, Saguinus geoffroyi LC
 Mottle-faced tamarin, Saguinus inustus LC
 White-footed tamarin, Saguinus leucopus VU
 Cottontop tamarin, Saguinus oedipus EN
Genus: Callimico
 Goeldi's marmoset, Callimico goeldii NT
Subfamily: Cebinae
Genus: Cebus
 Humboldt's white-fronted capuchin, Cebus albifrons LC
 Colombian white-faced capuchin, Cebus capucinus LC
 Río Cesar white-fronted capuchin, Cebus cesare DD
 Sierra de Perijá white-fronted capuchin, Cebus leucocephalus
 Santa Marta white-fronted capuchin, Cebus malitiosus EN
 Varied white-fronted capuchin, Cebus versicolor EN
 Marañón white-fronted capuchin, Cebus yuracus
Genus Sapajus
 Large-headed capuchin, Sapajus macrocephalus LC
Genus: Saimiri
 Humboldt's squirrel monkey, Saimiri cassiquiarensis 
Family: Aotidae
Genus: Aotus
 Gray-bellied night monkey, Aotus lemurinus VU
 Nancy Ma's night monkey, Aotus nancymaae LC
 Black-headed night monkey, Aotus nigriceps LC
 Three-striped night monkey, Aotus trivirgatus LC
 Spix's night monkey, Aotus vociferans LC
Family: Pitheciidae
Subfamily: Callicebinae
Genus: Callicebus
 White-tailed titi, Callicebus discolor LC
 Lucifer titi, Callicebus lucifer LC
 Black titi, Callicebus lugens LC
 Colombian black-handed titi, Callicebus medemi LC
 Ornate titi, Callicebus ornatus VU
Subfamily: Pitheciinae
Genus: Pithecia
 Hairy saki, Pithecia hirsuta DD
 Miller's saki, Pithecia milleri DD
Genus: Cacajao
 Bald uakari, Cacajao calvus VU possibly extirpated
 Black-headed uakari, Cacajao melanocephalus LC
Family: Atelidae
Subfamily: Alouattinae
Genus: Alouatta
 Mantled howler, Alouatta palliata LC
 Venezuelan red howler, Alouatta seniculus LC
Subfamily: Atelinae
Genus: Ateles
 White-fronted spider monkey, Ateles belzebuth VU
 Black-headed spider monkey, Ateles fusciceps CR
 Geoffroy's spider monkey, Ateles geoffroyi LC
 Brown spider monkey, Ateles hybridus CR
Genus: Lagothrix
 Brown woolly monkey, Lagothrix lagothricha LR/lc
 Colombian woolly monkey, Lagothrix lugens VU

Order: Rodentia (rodents)

Rodents make up the largest order of mammals, with over 40% of mammalian species. They have two incisors in the upper and lower jaw which grow continually and must be kept short by gnawing.

Suborder: Hystricognathi
Family: Erethizontidae (New World porcupines)
Subfamily: Erethizontinae
Genus: Coendou
 Bicolor-spined porcupine, Coendou bicolor LR/lc
 Brazilian porcupine, Coendou prehensilis LR/lc
 Stump-tailed porcupine, Coendou rufescens LR/lc
 Brown hairy dwarf porcupine, Coendou vestitus VU
Family: Dinomyidae (pacarana)
Genus: Dinomys
 Pacarana, Dinomys branickii EN
Family: Caviidae (guinea pigs)
Subfamily: Caviinae
Genus: Cavia
 Brazilian guinea pig, Cavia aperea LR/lc
Subfamily: Hydrochoerinae (capybaras and rock cavies)
Genus: Hydrochoerus
 Capybara, Hydrochoerus hydrochaeris LR/lc
 Lesser capybara, Hydrochoerus isthmius LR/lc
Family: Dasyproctidae (agoutis and pacas)
Genus: Dasyprocta
 Black agouti, Dasyprocta fuliginosa LR/lc
 Central American agouti, Dasyprocta punctata LR/lc
Genus: Myoprocta
 Red acouchi, Myoprocta acouchy LR/lc
Family: Cuniculidae
Genus: Cuniculus
 Lowland paca, Cuniculus paca LC
 Mountain paca, Cuniculus taczanowskii LR/nt
Family: Echimyidae
Subfamily: Dactylomyinae
Genus: Dactylomys
 Amazon bamboo rat, Dactylomys dactylinus LR/lc
Genus: Olallamys
 White-tailed olalla rat, Olallamys albicauda LR/nt
 Greedy olalla rat, Olallamys edax LR/nt
Subfamily: Echimyinae
Genus: Diplomys
 Colombian soft-furred spiny rat, Diplomys caniceps LR/nt
 Rufous soft-furred spiny-rat, Diplomys labilis LR/lc
Genus: Santamartamys
 Red-crested tree-rat, Santamartamys rufodorsalis CR
Genus: Echimys
 Speckled spiny tree-rat, Echimys semivillosus LR/lc
Genus: Isothrix
 Yellow-crowned brush-tailed rat, Isothrix bistriata LR/nt
Subfamily: Eumysopinae
Genus: Hoplomys
 Armored rat, Hoplomys gymnurus LR/lc
Genus: Mesomys
 Ferreira's spiny tree-rat, Mesomys hispidus LR/lc
Genus: Proechimys
 Short-tailed spiny rat, Proechimys brevicauda LR/lc
 Colombian spiny rat, Proechimys canicollis LR/lc
 Guyenne spiny rat, Proechimys guyannensis LR/lc
 Boyaca spiny rat, Proechimys chrysaeolus LR/lc
 Magdalena spiny rat, Proechimys magdalenae LR/lc
 Minca spiny rat, Proechimys mincae LR/lc
 O'Connell's spiny rat, Proechimys oconnelli LR/lc
 Gray-footed spiny rat, Proechimys poliopus LR/lc
 Napo spiny rat, Proechimys quadruplicatus LR/lc
 Tome's spiny rat, Proechimys semispinosus LR/lc
 Simon's spiny rat, Proechimys simonsi LR/lc
Suborder: Sciurognathi
Family: Sciuridae (squirrels)
Subfamily: Sciurinae
Tribe: Sciurini
Genus: Microsciurus
 Central American dwarf squirrel, Microsciurus alfari LR/lc
 Amazon dwarf squirrel, Microsciurus flaviventer LR/lc
 Western dwarf squirrel, Microsciurus mimulus LR/lc
 Santander dwarf squirrel, Microsciurus santanderensis LR/lc
Genus: Sciurus
 Red-tailed squirrel, Sciurus granatensis LR/lc
 Northern Amazon red squirrel, Sciurus igniventris LR/lc
 Andean squirrel, Sciurus pucheranii LR/lc
 Southern Amazon red squirrel, Sciurus spadiceus LR/lc
Family: Geomyidae
Genus: Orthogeomys
 Thaeler's pocket gopher, Orthogeomys thaeleri LR/lc
Family: Heteromyidae
Subfamily: Heteromyinae
Genus: Heteromys
 Trinidad spiny pocket mouse, Heteromys anomalus LR/lc
 Southern spiny pocket mouse, Heteromys australis LR/lc
 Desmarest's spiny pocket mouse, Heteromys desmarestianus LR/lc
Family: Cricetidae
Subfamily: Tylomyinae
Genus: Tylomys
 Mira climbing rat, Tylomys mirae LR/lc
Subfamily: Neotominae
Genus: Reithrodontomys
 Mexican harvest mouse, Reithrodontomys mexicanus LR/lc
Subfamily: Sigmodontinae
Genus: Aepeomys
 Dusky montane mouse, Aepeomys fuscatus LR/lc
Genus: Akodon
 Colombian grass mouse, Akodon affinis LR/lc
 Bogotá grass mouse, Akodon bogotensis LR/lc
 Northern grass mouse, Akodon urichi LR/lc
Genus: Calomys
 Hummelinck's vesper mouse, Calomys hummelincki LR/lc
Genus: Chibchanomys
 Chibchan water mouse, Chibchanomys trichotis LR/nt
Genus: Chilomys
 Colombian forest mouse, Chilomys instans LR/lc
Genus: Holochilus
 Amazonian marsh rat, Holochilus sciureus LR/lc
Genus: Ichthyomys
 Crab-eating rat, Ichthyomys hydrobates LR/nt
Genus: Melanomys
 Dusky rice rat, Melanomys caliginosus LR/lc
Genus: Microryzomys
 Highland small rice rat, Microryzomys altissimus LR/lc
 Forest small rice rat, Microryzomys minutus LR/lc
Genus: Neacomys
 Common bristly mouse, Neacomys spinosus LR/lc
 Narrow-footed bristly mouse, Neacomys tenuipes LR/lc
Genus: Nectomys
 Scaly-footed water rat, Nectomys squamipes LR/lc
Genus: Neusticomys
 Montane fish-eating rat, Neusticomys monticolus LR/lc
Genus: Oecomys
 Bicolored arboreal rice rat, Oecomys bicolor LR/lc
 Unicolored arboreal rice rat, Oecomys concolor LR/lc
 Yellow arboreal rice rat, Oecomys flavicans LR/lc
 Savanna arboreal rice rat, Oecomys speciosus LR/lc
 Trinidad arboreal rice rat, Oecomys trinitatis LR/lc
Genus: Oligoryzomys
 Destructive pygmy rice rat, Oligoryzomys destructor DD
 Fulvous pygmy rice rat, Oligoryzomys fulvescens LR/lc
 Grayish pygmy rice rat, Oligoryzomys griseolus LR/lc
Genus: Oryzomys
 Tomes's rice rat, Oryzomys albigularis LR/lc
 Alfaro's rice rat, Oryzomys alfaroi LR/lc
 Bolivar rice rat, Oryzomys bolivaris LR/lc
 Coues' rice rat, Oryzomys couesi LR/lc
 Gorgas's rice rat, Oryzomys gorgasi CR
 Colombian rice rat, Oryzomys intectus LR/lc
 MacConnell's rice rat, Oryzomys macconnelli LR/lc
 Azara's broad-headed rice rat, Oryzomys megacephalus LR/lc
 Talamancan rice rat, Oryzomys talamancae LR/lc
Genus: Rhipidomys
 Cauca climbing mouse, Rhipidomys caucensis LR/nt
 Coues's climbing mouse, Rhipidomys couesi LR/lc
 Buff-bellied climbing mouse, Rhipidomys fulviventer LR/lc
 Broad-footed climbing mouse, Rhipidomys latimanus LR/lc
 Atlantic Forest climbing mouse, Rhipidomys mastacalis LR/lc
 Venezuelan climbing mouse, Rhipidomys venezuelae LR/lc
Genus: Sigmodon
 Alston's cotton rat, Sigmodon alstoni LR/lc
 Southern cotton rat, Sigmodon hirsutus LC
Genus: Sigmodontomys
 Alfaro's rice water rat, Sigmodontomys alfari LR/lc
Genus: Thomasomys
 Golden Oldfield mouse, Thomasomys aureus LR/lc
 Silky Oldfield mouse, Thomasomys bombycinus LR/lc
 Ashy-bellied Oldfield mouse, Thomasomys cinereiventer LR/lc
 Woodland Oldfield mouse, Thomasomys hylophilus LR/lc
 Soft-furred Oldfield mouse, Thomasomys laniger LR/lc
 Unicolored Oldfield mouse, Thomasomys monochromos LR/nt
 Snow-footed Oldfield mouse, Thomasomys niveipes LR/lc
Genus: Zygodontomys
 Short-tailed cane rat, Zygodontomys brevicauda LR/lc
 Brown cane mouse, Zygodontomys brunneus LR/lc

Order: Lagomorpha (lagomorphs)

The lagomorphs comprise two families, Leporidae (hares and rabbits), and Ochotonidae (pikas). Though they can resemble rodents, and were classified as a superfamily in that order until the early 20th century, they have since been considered a separate order. They differ from rodents in a number of physical characteristics, such as having four incisors in the upper jaw rather than two.

Family: Leporidae (rabbits, hares)
Genus: Sylvilagus
 Andean tapetí, Sylvilagus andinus DD
Bogota tapetí, Sylvilagus apollinaris NE
Common tapetí, Sylvilagus brasiliensis EN
 Eastern cottontail, Sylvilagus floridanus LR/lc
Fulvous tapetí, Sylvilagus fulvescens NE
Nicefor's tapetí, Sylvilagus nicefori NE
Colombian tapetí, Sylvilagus salentus NE
Santa Marta tapetí, Sylvilagus sanctaemartae DD

Order: Eulipotyphla (shrews, hedgehogs, moles, and solenodons)

Eulipotyphlans are insectivorous mammals. Shrews and solenodons closely resemble mice, hedgehogs carry spines, while moles are stout-bodied burrowers.

Family: Soricidae (shrews)
Subfamily: Soricinae
Tribe: Blarinini
Genus: Cryptotis
 Andean small-eared shrew, Cryptotis avia LR/lc
 Scaly-footed small-eared shrew, Cryptotis squamipes LR/lc
 Thomas' small-eared shrew, Cryptotis thomasi LR/lc

Order: Chiroptera (bats)

The bats' most distinguishing feature is that their forelimbs are developed as wings, making them the only mammals capable of flight. Bat species account for about 20% of all mammals.

Family: Noctilionidae
Genus: Noctilio
 Lesser bulldog bat, Noctilio albiventris LR/lc
 Greater bulldog bat, Noctilio leporinus LR/lc
Family: Vespertilionidae
Subfamily: Myotinae
Genus: Myotis
 Silver-tipped myotis, Myotis albescens LR/lc
 Hairy-legged myotis, Myotis keaysi LR/lc
 Curacao myotis, Myotis nesopolus LR/nt
 Black myotis, Myotis nigricans LR/lc
 Montane myotis, Myotis oxyotus LR/lc
 Riparian myotis, Myotis riparius LR/lc
 Velvety myotis, Myotis simus LR/lc
Subfamily: Vespertilioninae
Genus: Eptesicus
 Little black serotine, Eptesicus andinus LR/lc
 Brazilian brown bat, Eptesicus brasiliensis LR/lc
 Argentine brown bat, Eptesicus furinalis LR/lc
 Big brown bat, Eptesicus fuscus LR/lc
Genus: Histiotus
 Small big-eared brown bat, Histiotus montanus LR/lc
Genus: Lasiurus
 Desert red bat, Lasiurus blossevillii LR/lc
 Tacarcuna bat, Lasiurus castaneus VU
 Hoary bat, Lasiurus cinereus LR/lc
 Southern yellow bat, Lasiurus ega LR/lc
 Big red bat, Lasiurus egregius LR/nt
Genus: Rhogeessa
 Tiny yellow bat, Rhogeessa minutilla LR/nt
Family: Molossidae
Genus: Cynomops
 Cinnamon dog-faced bat, Cynomops abrasus LR/nt
 Greenhall's dog-faced bat, Cynomops greenhalli LR/lc
 Southern dog-faced bat, Cynomops planirostris LR/lc
Genus: Eumops
 Black bonneted bat, Eumops auripendulus LR/lc
 Dwarf bonneted bat, Eumops bonariensis LR/lc
 Big bonneted bat, Eumops dabbenei LR/lc
 Wagner's bonneted bat, Eumops glaucinus LR/lc
 Sanborn's bonneted bat, Eumops hansae LR/lc
 Western mastiff bat, Eumops perotis LR/lc
Genus: Molossops
 Mato Grosso dog-faced bat, Molossops mattogrossensis LR/nt
 Dwarf dog-faced bat, Molossops temminckii LR/lc
Genus: Molossus
 Black mastiff bat, Molossus ater LR/lc
 Bonda mastiff bat, Molossus bondae LR/lc
 Velvety free-tailed bat, Molossus molossus LR/lc
 Miller's mastiff bat, Molossus pretiosus LR/lc
 Sinaloan mastiff bat, Molossus sinaloae LR/lc
Genus: Nyctinomops
 Peale's free-tailed bat, Nyctinomops aurispinosus LR/lc
 Broad-eared bat, Nyctinomops laticaudatus LR/lc
 Big free-tailed bat, Nyctinomops macrotis LR/lc
Genus: Promops
 Big crested mastiff bat, Promops centralis LR/lc
Genus: Tadarida
 Mexican free-tailed bat, Tadarida brasiliensis LR/nt
Family: Emballonuridae
Genus: Balantiopteryx
 Ecuadorian sac-winged bat, Balantiopteryx infusca EN
Genus: Centronycteris
 Shaggy bat, Centronycteris maximiliani LR/lc
Genus: Cormura
 Wagner's sac-winged bat, Cormura brevirostris LR/lc
Genus: Cyttarops
 Short-eared bat, Cyttarops alecto LR/nt
Genus: Diclidurus
 Northern ghost bat, Diclidurus albus LR/lc
 Greater ghost bat, Diclidurus ingens VU
 Isabelle's ghost bat, Diclidurus isabella LR/nt
Genus: Peropteryx
 Greater dog-like bat, Peropteryx kappleri LR/lc
 White-winged dog-like bat, Peropteryx leucoptera LR/lc
 Lesser doglike bat, Peropteryx macrotis LR/lc
Genus: Rhynchonycteris
 Proboscis bat, Rhynchonycteris naso LR/lc
Genus: Saccopteryx
 Greater sac-winged bat, Saccopteryx bilineata LR/lc
 Frosted sac-winged bat, Saccopteryx canescens LR/lc
 Lesser sac-winged bat, Saccopteryx leptura LR/lc
Family: Mormoopidae
Genus: Mormoops
 Ghost-faced bat, Mormoops megalophylla LR/lc
Genus: Pteronotus
 Naked-backed bat, Pteronotus davyi LR/lc
 Big naked-backed bat, Pteronotus gymnonotus LR/lc
 Parnell's mustached bat, Pteronotus parnellii LR/lc
 Wagner's mustached bat, Pteronotus personatus LR/lc
Family: Phyllostomidae
Subfamily: Phyllostominae
Genus: Chrotopterus
 Big-eared woolly bat, Chrotopterus auritus LR/lc
Genus: Glyphonycteris
 Davies's big-eared bat, Glyphonycteris daviesi LR/nt
 Tricolored big-eared bat, Glyphonycteris sylvestris LR/nt
Genus: Lampronycteris
 Yellow-throated big-eared bat, Lampronycteris brachyotis LR/lc
Genus: Lonchorhina
 Tomes's sword-nosed bat, Lonchorhina aurita LR/lc
 Marinkelle's sword-nosed bat, Lonchorhina marinkellei VU
 Orinoco sword-nosed bat, Lonchorhina orinocensis LR/nt
Genus: Lophostoma
 Pygmy round-eared bat, Lophostoma brasiliense LR/lc
 Carriker's round-eared bat, Lophostoma carrikeri VU
 White-throated round-eared bat, Lophostoma silvicolum LR/lc
Genus: Macrophyllum
 Long-legged bat, Macrophyllum macrophyllum LR/lc
Genus: Micronycteris
 Hairy big-eared bat, Micronycteris hirsuta LR/lc
 Little big-eared bat, Micronycteris megalotis LR/lc
 White-bellied big-eared bat, Micronycteris minuta LR/lc
 Schmidts's big-eared bat, Micronycteris schmidtorum LR/lc
Genus: Mimon
 Striped hairy-nosed bat, Mimon crenulatum LR/lc
Genus: Neonycteris
 Least big-eared bat, Neonycteris pusilla VU
Genus: Phylloderma
 Pale-faced bat, Phylloderma stenops LR/lc
Genus: Phyllostomus
 Pale spear-nosed bat, Phyllostomus discolor LR/lc
 Lesser spear-nosed bat, Phyllostomus elongatus LR/lc
 Greater spear-nosed bat, Phyllostomus hastatus LR/lc
 Guianan spear-nosed bat, Phyllostomus latifolius LR/nt
Genus: Tonatia
 Stripe-headed round-eared bat, Tonatia saurophila LR/lc
Genus: Trachops
 Fringe-lipped bat, Trachops cirrhosus LR/lc
Genus: Trinycteris
 Niceforo's big-eared bat, Trinycteris nicefori LR/lc
Genus: Vampyrum
 Spectral bat, Vampyrum spectrum LR/nt
Subfamily: Lonchophyllinae
Genus: Lionycteris
 Chestnut long-tongued bat, Lionycteris spurrelli LR/lc
Genus: Lonchophylla
 Handley's nectar bat, Lonchophylla handleyi VU
 Godman's nectar bat, Lonchophylla mordax LR/lc
 Orange nectar bat, Lonchophylla robusta LR/lc
 Thomas's nectar bat, Lonchophylla thomasi LR/lc
Subfamily: Glossophaginae
Genus: Anoura
 Tailed tailless bat, Anoura caudifer LR/lc
 Handley's tailless bat, Anoura cultrata LR/lc
 Geoffroy's tailless bat, Anoura geoffroyi LR/lc
 Broad-toothed tailless bat, Anoura latidens LR/nt
Genus: Choeroniscus
 Godman's long-tailed bat, Choeroniscus godmani LR/nt
 Intermediate long-tailed bat, Choeroniscus intermedius LR/nt
 Minor long-nosed long-tongued bat, Choeroniscus minor LR/lc
 Greater long-tailed bat, Choeroniscus periosus VU
Genus: Glossophaga
 Commissaris's long-tongued bat, Glossophaga commissarisi LR/lc
 Miller's long-tongued bat, Glossophaga longirostris LR/lc
 Pallas's long-tongued bat, Glossophaga soricina LR/lc
Genus: Leptonycteris
 Southern long-nosed bat, Leptonycteris curasoae VU
Genus: Lichonycteris
 Dark long-tongued bat, Lichonycteris obscura LR/lc
Genus: Scleronycteris
 Ega long-tongued bat, Scleronycteris ega VU
Subfamily: Carolliinae
Genus: Carollia
 Silky short-tailed bat, Carollia brevicauda LR/lc
 Chestnut short-tailed bat, Carollia castanea LR/lc
 Seba's short-tailed bat, Carollia perspicillata LR/lc
Genus: Rhinophylla
 Hairy little fruit bat, Rhinophylla alethina LR/nt
 Fischer's little fruit bat, Rhinophylla fischerae LR/nt
Subfamily: Stenodermatinae
Genus: Artibeus
 Large fruit-eating bat, Artibeus amplus LR/nt
 Andersen's fruit-eating bat, Artibeus anderseni LR/lc
 Brown fruit-eating bat, Artibeus concolor LR/nt
 Silver fruit-eating bat, Artibeus glaucus LR/lc
 Jamaican fruit bat, Artibeus jamaicensis LR/lc
 Great fruit-eating bat, Artibeus lituratus LR/lc
 Dark fruit-eating bat, Artibeus obscurus LR/nt
 Pygmy fruit-eating bat, Artibeus phaeotis LR/lc
 Flat-faced fruit-eating bat, Artibeus planirostris LR/lc
 Toltec fruit-eating bat, Artibeus toltecus LR/lc
Genus: Centurio
 Wrinkle-faced bat, Centurio senex LR/lc
Genus: Chiroderma
 Salvin's big-eyed bat, Chiroderma salvini LR/lc
 Little big-eyed bat, Chiroderma trinitatum LR/lc
 Hairy big-eyed bat, Chiroderma villosum LR/lc
Genus: Ectophylla
 Honduran white bat, Ectophylla alba LR/nt
Genus: Enchisthenes
 Velvety fruit-eating bat, Enchisthenes hartii LR/lc
Genus: Mesophylla
 MacConnell's bat, Mesophylla macconnelli LR/lc
Genus: Sphaeronycteris
 Visored bat, Sphaeronycteris toxophyllum LR/lc
Genus: Sturnira
 Aratathomas's yellow-shouldered bat, Sturnira aratathomasi LR/nt
 Bidentate yellow-shouldered bat, Sturnira bidens LR/nt
 Bogota yellow-shouldered bat, Sturnira bogotensis LR/lc
 Hairy yellow-shouldered bat, Sturnira erythromos LR/lc
 Little yellow-shouldered bat, Sturnira lilium LR/lc
 Highland yellow-shouldered bat, Sturnira ludovici LR/lc
 Louis's yellow-shouldered bat, Sturnira luisi LR/lc
 Greater yellow-shouldered bat, Sturnira magna LR/nt
 Talamancan yellow-shouldered bat, Sturnira mordax LR/nt
 Tilda's yellow-shouldered bat, Sturnira tildae LR/lc
Genus: Uroderma
 Tent-making bat, Uroderma bilobatum LR/lc
 Brown tent-making bat, Uroderma magnirostrum LR/lc
Genus: Vampyressa
 Bidentate yellow-eared bat, Vampyressa bidens LR/nt
 Brock's yellow-eared bat, Vampyressa brocki LR/nt
 Melissa's yellow-eared bat, Vampyressa melissa LR/nt
 Striped yellow-eared bat, Vampyressa nymphaea LR/lc
 Southern little yellow-eared bat, Vampyressa pusilla LR/lc
Genus: Vampyrodes
 Great stripe-faced bat, Vampyrodes caraccioli LR/lc
Genus: Platyrrhinus
 Eldorado broad-nosed bat, Platyrrhinus aurarius LR/nt
 Short-headed broad-nosed bat, Platyrrhinus brachycephalus LR/lc
 Choco broad-nosed bat, Platyrrhinus chocoensis VU
 Thomas's broad-nosed bat, Platyrrhinus dorsalis LR/lc
 Heller's broad-nosed bat, Platyrrhinus helleri LR/lc
 Buffy broad-nosed bat, Platyrrhinus infuscus LR/nt
 White-lined broad-nosed bat, Platyrrhinus lineatus LR/lc
 Shadowy broad-nosed bat, Platyrrhinus umbratus LR/nt
 Greater broad-nosed bat, Platyrrhinus vittatus LR/lc
Subfamily: Desmodontinae
Genus: Desmodus
 Common vampire bat, Desmodus rotundus LR/lc
Genus: Diaemus
 White-winged vampire bat, Diaemus youngi LR/lc
Genus: Diphylla
 Hairy-legged vampire bat, Diphylla ecaudata LR/nt
Family: Natalidae
Genus: Chilonatalus
 Cuban funnel-eared bat, Chilonatalus micropus LR/lc
Family: Furipteridae
Genus: Furipterus
 Thumbless bat, Furipterus horrens LR/lc
Family: Thyropteridae
Genus: Thyroptera
 Peters's disk-winged bat, Thyroptera discifera LR/lc
 Spix's disk-winged bat, Thyroptera tricolor LR/lc

Order: Cetacea (whales)

The order Cetacea includes whales, dolphins and porpoises. They are the mammals most fully adapted to aquatic life with a spindle-shaped nearly hairless body, protected by a thick layer of blubber, and forelimbs and tail modified to provide propulsion underwater.

Suborder: Mysticeti
Family: Balaenopteridae (baleen whales)
Genus: Balaenoptera 
 Common minke whale, Balaenoptera acutorostrata
 Sei whale, Balaenoptera borealis
 Bryde's whale, Balaenoptera brydei
 Blue whale, Balaenoptera musculus
Genus: Megaptera
 Humpback whale, Megaptera novaeangliae
Suborder: Odontoceti
Superfamily: Platanistoidea
Family: Delphinidae (marine dolphins)
Genus: Delphinus
 Short-beaked common dolphin, Delphinus delphis DD
Genus: Feresa
 Pygmy killer whale, Feresa attenuata DD
Genus: Globicephala
 Short-finned pilot whale, Globicephala macrorhyncus DD
Genus: Lagenodelphis
 Fraser's dolphin, Lagenodelphis hosei DD
Genus: Grampus
 Risso's dolphin, Grampus griseus DD
Genus: Orcinus
 Killer whale, Orcinus orca DD
Genus: Peponocephala
 Melon-headed whale, Peponocephala electra DD
Genus: Pseudorca
 False killer whale, Pseudorca crassidens DD
Genus: Sotalia
 Guiana dolphin, Sotalia guianensis DD
 Tucuxi, Sotalia fluviatilis DD
 Amazon river dolphin, Sotalia geoffrensis DD
Genus: Stenella
 Pantropical spotted dolphin, Stenella attenuata DD
 Clymene dolphin, Stenella clymene DD
 Striped dolphin, Stenella coeruleoalba DD
 Atlantic spotted dolphin, Stenella frontalis DD
 Spinner dolphin, Stenella longirostris DD
Genus: Steno
 Rough-toothed dolphin, Steno bredanensis DD
Genus: Tursiops
 Common bottlenose dolphin, Tursiops truncatus
Family: Physeteridae (sperm whales)
Genus: Physeter
 Sperm whale, Physeter catodon DD
Family: Kogiidae (dwarf sperm whales)
Genus: Kogia
 Pygmy sperm whale, Kogia breviceps DD
 Dwarf sperm whale, Kogia sima DD
Superfamily Ziphioidea
Family: Ziphidae (beaked whales)
Genus: Mesoplodon
 Gervais' beaked whale, Mesoplodon europaeus DD
 Ginkgo-toothed beaked whale, Mesoplodon ginkgodens DD
 Pygmy beaked whale, Mesoplodon peruvianus DD
Genus: Ziphius
 Cuvier's beaked whale, Ziphius cavirostris DD

Order: Carnivora (carnivorans)

There are over 260 species of carnivores, the majority of which eat meat as their primary dietary item. They have a characteristic skull shape and dentition.
Suborder: Feliformia
Family: Felidae (cats)
Subfamily: Felinae
Genus: Herpailurus
Jaguarundi, H. yagouaroundi 
Genus: Leopardus
Pampas cat L. colocola  presence uncertain
Ocelot L. pardalis 
Oncilla L. tigrinus 
Southern tigrina L. guttulus 
Margay L. wiedii 
Genus: Puma
Cougar, P. concolor 
Subfamily: Pantherinae
Genus: Panthera
Jaguar, P. onca 
Suborder: Caniformia
Family: Canidae (dogs, foxes)
Genus: Atelocynus
 Short-eared dog, Atelocynus microtis NT
Genus: Cerdocyon
 Crab-eating fox, Cerdocyon thous LC
Genus: Lycalopex
 Culpeo, Lycalopex culpaeus LC
Genus: Speothos
 Bush dog, Speothos venaticus VU
Genus: Urocyon
 Gray fox, Urocyon cinereoargenteus LC
Family: Ursidae (bears)
Genus: Tremarctos
 Spectacled bear, Tremarctos ornatus VU
Family: Procyonidae (raccoons)
Genus: Bassaricyon
 Eastern lowland olingo, Bassaricyon alleni
 Western lowland olingo, Bassaricyon medius LC
 Olinguito, Bassaricyon neblina NT
Genus: Nasua
 White-nosed coati, Nasua narica LC
 South American coati, Nasua nasua LC
Genus: Nasuella
 Mountain coati, Nasuella olivacea NT
Genus: Potos
 Kinkajou, Potos flavus LC
Genus: Procyon
 Crab-eating raccoon, Procyon cancrivorusLC
Family: Mustelidae (mustelids)
Genus: Eira
 Tayra, Eira barbara LC
Genus: Galictis
 Greater grison, Galictis vittata LC
Genus: Lontra
 Neotropical river otter, Lontra longicaudis NT
Genus: Neogale
 Amazon weasel, N. africana LC
 Colombian weasel, N. felipei VU
 Long-tailed weasel, N. frenata LC
Genus: Pteronura
 Giant otter, Pteronura brasiliensis EN
Family: Mephitidae
Genus: Conepatus
 Striped hog-nosed skunk, Conepatus semistriatus
Family: Phocidae (earless seals)
Genus: Neomonachus
 Caribbean monk seal, Neomonachus tropicalis EX
Family: Otariidae
Genus: Otaria
South American sea lion, Otaria flavescens LC (vagrant)
Genus: Arctocephalus
Galápagos fur seal, Arctocephalus galapagoensis EN
Genus: Zalophus
Galápagos sea lion, Zalophus wollebaeki EN

Order: Perissodactyla (odd-toed ungulates)

The odd-toed ungulates are browsing and grazing mammals. They are usually large to very large, and have relatively simple stomachs and a large middle toe.

Family: Tapiridae (tapirs)
Genus: Tapirus
 Baird's tapir, Tapirus bairdii EN
 Mountain tapir, Tapirus pinchaque EN
 Brazilian tapir, Tapirus terrestris VU

Order: Artiodactyla (even-toed ungulates)

The even-toed ungulates are ungulates whose weight is borne about equally by the third and fourth toes, rather than mostly or entirely by the third as in perissodactyls. There are about 220 artiodactyl species, including many that are of great economic importance to humans.

Family: Cervidae (deer)
Subfamily: Capreolinae
Genus: Mazama
 Red brocket, Mazama americana DD
 Merida brocket, Mazama bricenii VU
 Amazonian brown brocket, Mazama nemorivaga LC
 Little red brocket, Mazama rufina LR/nt
 Central American red brocket, Mazama temama DD
Genus: Odocoileus
 White-tailed deer, O. virginianus LC
Genus: Pudu
 Pudu, Pudu mephistophiles DD
Family: Hippopotamidae (hippopotamus)
Genus: Hippopotamus
 Hippopotamus, Hippopotamus amphibius VU introduced
Family: Tayassuidae (peccaries)
Genus: Dicotyles
 Collared peccary, Dicotyles tajacu LC
Genus: Tayassu
 White-lipped peccary, Tayassu pecari NT

See also
List of chordate orders
Lists of mammals by region
List of prehistoric mammals
Mammal classification
List of mammals described in the 2000s

References

External links

Colombia
 
Mammals
Colombia